9MA is the only release by Brazilian alternative rock band Nove Mil Anjos. It came out in 2008 through the band's own label, 9MA Music, and distributed by Sky Blue Music. Produced in Los Angeles by Sebastian Krys, who previously worked with drummer Junior Lima's former group Sandy & Junior, the album spawned the singles "Chuva Agora" (made available for listening in advance through the band's official Myspace page) and "Visionário".

Upon its release 9MA received mostly positive reviews, with the music video for "Chuva Agora" being at one point one of the most viewed at the website of now-defunct MTV Brasil. Conversely, music critic Amauri Stamboroski Jr., writing for website G1, gave the album a scathing review, calling it a "disastrous" and "unoriginal" output and comparing it unfavorably to the sonority of bands such as Red Hot Chili Peppers, Rage Against the Machine and Nirvana. He then proceeded to give the album a rating of 1 out of a possible 10.

Track listing

Personnel
 Péricles "Perí" Carpigiani – vocals
 Junior Lima – drums
 Champignon – bass guitar
 Peu Sousa – electric guitar
 Sebastian Krys – production

References

2008 debut albums
Albums produced by Sebastian Krys
Nove Mil Anjos albums